Cabinet Secretariat may refer to:
 Cabinet Secretariat (India)
 Cabinet Secretariat (Indonesia)
 Cabinet Secretariat (Japan)
 Cabinet Secretariat in the Cabinet Directorate of the devolved Scottish Government in the United Kingdom
Cabinet Secretariat (Pakistan)